Wallingford held a by-election on 9 March 1872 because of the death of the incumbent MP of the Conservative Party, Stanley Vickers.  It was won by the Conservative candidate Edward Wells, who was unopposed.

References

1872 in England
1872 elections in the United Kingdom
By-elections to the Parliament of the United Kingdom in Oxfordshire constituencies
By-elections to the Parliament of the United Kingdom in Berkshire constituencies
Wallingford, Oxfordshire
Unopposed by-elections to the Parliament of the United Kingdom in English constituencies
19th century in Berkshire